The Mining and Pastoral Region is a multi-member electoral region of the Western Australian Legislative Council, located in the northern and eastern regions of the state. It was created by the Acts Amendment (Electoral Reform) Act 1987, and became effective on 22 May 1989 with five members who had been elected at the 1989 state election three months earlier. At the 2008 election, it was increased to six members.

Legislation to abolish the region, along with all other Western Australian Electoral Regions was passed in November 2021, with the 2025 state election to use a single state-wide electorate of 37 members.

Geography
The Region is made up of several complete Legislative Assembly districts, which change at each distribution.

Representation

Distribution of seats

Members
Since its creation, the electorate has had 24 members. All five of the members elected in 1989 had previously been members of the Legislative Council—two from the Lower North Province, two from the North Province and one from the South-East Province.

Election Results

2021

2017

References

Mining and Pastoral
Constituencies established in 1989
1989 establishments in Australia